Dmitri Shostakovich typically catalogued his compositions and occasionally his arrangements of other composers' music with opus numbers. He began this practice with the early Scherzo in F-sharp minor and continued until the end of his life. Nevertheless, most of his juvenilia, unfinished works from his artistic maturity (such as the operas Orango and The Gamblers), and numerous completed works were left unnumbered. There were also instances when Shostakovich took an opus number assigned to one work, then gave it to another, or was undecided about the numbering of a finished composition. Further complicating the matter was an error he committed in compiling his own music in the 1930s. This led to his soundtracks for The Youth of Maxim and Girl Friends sharing the same opus number.

By genre

Symphonies
 Op. 10: Symphony No. 1 in F minor (1923–1925)
 Op. 14: Symphony No. 2 in B major, To October, for mixed chorus and orchestra (1927)
 Op. 20: Symphony No. 3 in E major, The First of May, for mixed chorus and orchestra (1929)
 Op. 43: Symphony No. 4 in C minor (1935–1936)
 Op. 47: Symphony No. 5 in D minor (1937)
 Op. 54: Symphony No. 6 in B minor (1939)
 Op. 60: Symphony No. 7 in C major, Leningrad (1941)
 Op. 65: Symphony No. 8 in C minor (1943)
 Op. 70: Symphony No. 9 in E major (1945)
 Op. 93: Symphony No. 10 in E minor (1953)
 Op. 103: Symphony No. 11 in G minor, The Year 1905 (1957)
 Op. 112: Symphony No. 12 in D minor, The Year 1917 (1961)
 Op. 113: Symphony No. 13 in B minor, Babi-Yar, for bass, bass chorus, and orchestra (1962)
 Op. 135: Symphony No. 14, for soprano, bass, string orchestra, and percussion (1969)
 Op. 141: Symphony No. 15 in A major (1971)

Concertos
 Op. 35: Piano Concerto No. 1 in C minor (1933); also known as the Concerto in C minor for Piano, Trumpet, and String Orchestra
 Op. 77: Violin Concerto No. 1 in A minor (1947–1948, originally published as Op. 99)
 Op. 102: Piano Concerto No. 2 in F major (1957)
 Op. 107: Cello Concerto No. 1 in E major (1959)
 Op. 126: Cello Concerto No. 2 in G major (1966)
 Op. 129: Violin Concerto No. 2 in C minor (1967)

Suites
 Op. 15a: Suite from The Nose, for tenor, baritone, and orchestra (1927–1928)
 Op. 22a: Suite from The Age of Gold, for orchestra (1929–1930)
 Op. 27a: Suite from The Bolt, for orchestra (1931)
 Op. 30a: Suite from Golden Mountains, for orchestra (1931)
 Op. 32a: Suite from Hamlet, for small orchestra (1932)
 Op. 36a: Suite from The Tale of the Priest and of His Workman Balda (1935)
 Suite for Jazz Orchestra No. 1 (1934)
 Op. 39a: Suite from The Limpid Stream, for orchestra (1934–1935)
 Op. 50a: Suite from The Maxim Trilogy for chorus and orchestra (1938)
 Suite for Jazz Orchestra No. 2 (3 movements) (1938)
 Op. 64a: Suite from Zoya, for chorus and orchestra (1944, arranged by Levon Atovmyan)
 Op. 75a: Suite from The Young Guard (1951, arranged by Levon Atovmyan)
 Op. 76a: Suite from Pirogov, for orchestra (1947, arranged by Levon Atovmyan)
 Op. 78a: Suite from Michurin, for chorus and orchestra (1964, arranged by Levon Atovmyan)
 Op. 80a: Suite from Meeting on the Elbe, for voices and orchestra (1948)
 Op. 82a: Suite from The Fall of Berlin, for chorus and orchestra (1949, arranged by Levon Atovmyan)
 Ballet Suite No. 1, for orchestra (1949, arranged by Levon Atovmyan)
 Ballet Suite No. 2, for orchestra (1951, arranged by Levon Atovmyan)
 Ballet Suite No. 3, for orchestra (1953, arranged by Levon Atovmyan)
 Ballet Suite No. 4, for orchestra (1953, arranged by Levon Atovmyan)
 Op. 85a: Suite from Belinsky, for chorus and orchestra (1960, arranged by Levon Atovmyan)
 Op. 89a: Suite from The Unforgettable Year 1919, for orchestra (1953, arranged by Levon Atovmyan)
 Op. 97a: Suite from The Gadfly, for orchestra (1955, arranged by Levon Atovmyan)
 Op. 99a: Suite from The First Echelon, for chorus and orchestra (1956)
 Suite for Variety Orchestra (8 movements) (post-1956)
 Op. 111a: Suite from Five Days, Five Nights, for orchestra (1961)
 Op. 114a: Suite of Five Fragments from the opera Katarina Izmailova, for orchestra (1963)
 Op. 116a: Suite from Hamlet, for orchestra (1964, arranged by Levon Atovmyan)
 Op. 120a: Suite from A Year Is Like a Lifetime, for orchestra (1965)

Miscellaneous symphonic works
 Op. 1: Scherzo in F minor, for orchestra (1919)
 Op. 3: Theme and Variations in B major, for orchestra (1921–1922)
 Op. 7: Scherzo in E major, for orchestra (1923–1924)
 Op. 23: Overture and Finale to Erwin Dressel's opera Armer Columbus, for orchestra (1929)
 The Green Company, overture for orchestra (1931)
 Op. 42: Five Fragments, for small orchestra (1935)
 Solemn March, for military band/wind orchestra (1942)
 Three Pieces, for orchestra (1947–1948)
 Op. 96: Festive Overture in A major, for orchestra (1954)
 Op. 111b: Novorossiisk Chimes, the Flame of Eternal Glory, for orchestra (1960)
 Op. 115: Overture on Russian and Kirghiz Folk Themes, for orchestra (1963)
 Op. 130: Funeral-Triumphal Prelude, for orchestra (1967)
 Op. 131: October, symphonic poem in C minor for orchestra (1967)
 Op. 139: "March of the Soviet Militia", for military band/wind orchestra (1970)
 Intervision, for orchestra (1971)

String quartets
 Two Pieces for string quartet (1931) (arranged from Lady Macbeth of the Mtsensk District and from The Golden Age)
 Op. 49: String Quartet No. 1 in C major (1938) 
 Op. 68: String Quartet No. 2 in A major (1944) 
 Op. 73: String Quartet No. 3 in F major (1946) 
 Op. 83: String Quartet No. 4 in D major (1949) 
 Op. 92: String Quartet No. 5 in B major (1952)
 Op. 101: String Quartet No. 6 in G major (1956)
 Op. 108: String Quartet No. 7 in F minor (1960) 
 Op. 110: String Quartet No. 8 in C minor (1960)
 Quartet Movement in E major (surviving movement of an early version of the String Quartet No. 9; circa 1960)
 Op. 117: String Quartet No. 9 in E major (1964)
 Op. 118: String Quartet No. 10 in A major (1964) 
 Op. 122: String Quartet No. 11 in F minor (1966)
 Op. 133: String Quartet No. 12 in D major (1968)
 Op. 138: String Quartet No. 13 in B minor (1970) 
 Op. 142: String Quartet No. 14 in F major (1972–1973)
 Op. 144: String Quartet No. 15 in E minor (1974)

Other chamber/instrumental works
 Op. 8: Piano Trio No. 1 in C minor (1923)
 Op. 9: Three Pieces, for cello and piano (1923–1924, lost; a fourth piece may have been destroyed by the composer)
 Op. 11: Two Pieces, for string octet (1924–1925)
 Op. 33 [sic]: Impromptu (Экспромт), for viola and piano (1931)
 Op. 40: Cello Sonata in D minor (1934)
 Op. 40a: Moderato, for cello and piano (1934)
 Op. 57: Piano Quintet in G minor (1940)
 Op. 58i: Polka in F minor, for two harps (1941)
 Op. 67: Piano Trio No. 2 in E minor (1944)
 Op. 134: Violin Sonata (1968)
 Op. 147: Viola Sonata (1975)

Piano
 Op. 2: Eight Preludes (1919–1920)
 Minuet, Prelude, and Intermezzo (1917 or 1919–1920)
 Murzilka (1920)
 Op. 5: Three Fantastic Dances (1922)
 Op. 6: Suite in F minor for two pianos (1922)
 Op. 12: Sonata No. 1 (1926)
 Op. 13: Aphorisms (1927)
 Op. 34: 24 Preludes (1932–1933)
 Op. 61: Sonata No. 2 in B minor (1943)
 Op. 69: Children's Notebook (1944–1945)
 Merry March for two pianos (1949)
 Op. 87: 24 Preludes and Fugues (1950-1951)
 Dances of the Dolls (1952)
 Op. 94: Concertino in A minor for two pianos (1953)
 Tarantella for two pianos (1954)
 Variations VIII, IX, and XI for the Eleven Variations on a Theme by Glinka (1957)

Operas
 The Gypsies, opera after Pushkin (1919–1920; partially destroyed) 
 Op. 15: The Nose, satirical opera in three acts (and an epilogue) after Gogol (1927–1928); also a suite for orchestra (see Op. 15a)
 Op. 29: Lady Macbeth of the Mtsensk District, opera in four acts after Leskov (1930–1934); later revised as Katerina Ismailova (see Op. 114); also a suite for orchestra (see Op. 29a)
 The Big Lightning, comic opera (1932–1933; unfinished)
 Orango, satirical opera in three acts (and a prologue) (1932; unfinished)
 The Twelve Chairs, operetta (1939; unfinished sketches)
 Katyusha Maslova, opera after Tolstoy's novel Resurrection (1940–1941; unfinished sketches)
 The Gamblers, opera after Gogol (1941–1942; unfinished); completion in two acts by Krzysztof Meyer in 1978
 Op. 105: Moscow, Cheryomushki, operetta in three acts (1957–1958); also a film version (see Op. 105a)
 Op. 114: Katerina Ismailova, opera in four acts after Leskov (1956–1963); revision of Lady Macbeth of the Mtsensk District (see Op. 29); also a suite of five entr'actes (see Op. 114a) and a film version

Ballets
 Op. 22: The Golden Age, three acts (1929–1930)
 Op. 27: The Bolt, three acts (1930–1931)
 Op. 39: The Limpid Stream (also translated as The Bright Stream), three acts (1934–1935; some numbers recycled from Op. 27)
 The Lady and the Hooligan, one act (7 scenes) (1962; compiled and arranged from the scores of Ops. 27, 39, 40, 50a, 95, and 97 by Levon Atovmyan)
 The Dreamers, four acts (1975; compiled from the scores of Ops. 22 and 27 by the composer and Sergei Sapozhnikov)

Film scores
 Op. 18: Music to the silent film The New Babylon for small orchestra (1929)
 Op. 26: Music to the film Alone (1930–1931)
 Op. 30: Music to the film Golden Mountains (1931)
 Op. 33: Music to the film Counterplan (1932)
 Op. 36: Music to the animated film The Tale of the Priest and of His Workman Balda for chamber orchestra (1933–1934)
 Op. 38: Music to the film Love and Hate (1934)
 Op. 41: Music to the film Girl Friends (1934–1935)
 Op. 41a: Music to the film The Youth of Maxim (1934–1935)
 Op. 45: Music to the film The Return of Maxim (1936–1937)
 Op. 48: Music to the film Volochayev Days (1936–1937)
 Op. 50: Music to the film The Vyborg Side (1938)
 Op. 51: Music to the film Friends (1938)
 Op. 52: Music to the film The Great Citizen, first part (1938)
 Op. 53: Music to the film The Man with the Gun (1938)
 Op. 55: Music to the film The Great Citizen, second part (1939)
 Op. 56: Music to the animated film The Silly Little Mouse (1939)
 Op. 59: Music to the film The Adventures of Korzinkina (1940)
 Op. 64: Music to the film Zoya (1944)
 Op. 71: Music to the film Simple People (1945)
 Op. 75: Music to the film The Young Guard (1947–1948)
 Op. 76: Music to the film Pirogov (1947)
 Op. 78: Music to the film Michurin (1948)
 Op. 80: Music to the film Meeting on the Elbe for voices and piano (1948)
 Op. 82: Music to the film The Fall of Berlin (1949)
 Op. 85: Music to the film Belinsky for orchestra and chorus (1950)
 Op. 89: Music to the film The Unforgettable Year 1919 (1951)
 Op. 95: Music to the film Song of the Great Rivers (1954)
 Op. 97: Music to the film The Gadfly (1955)
 Op. 99: Music to the film The First Echelon (1955–1956)
 Op. 105a: Music to the film Moscow, Cheryomushki(1962)
 Op. 111: Music to the film Five Days, Five Nights (1960)
 Op. 114b: Music to the film Katerina Izmailova (1966)
 Op. 116: Music to the film Hamlet after Shakespeare for orchestra (1963–1964)
 Op. 120: Music to the film A Year Is Like a Lifetime for orchestra (1965)
 Op. 132: Music to the film Sofiya Perovskaya (1967)
 Op. 137: Music to the film King Lear after Shakespeare (1970)

Incidental music
 Op. 19: Music to the comedy The Bedbug by Mayakovsky (1929)
 Op. 24: Music to the play The Gunshot by Bezymensky (1929)
 Op. 25: Music to the play Virgin Soil by Gorbenko and L'vov (1930)
 Op. 28: Music to the play Rule, Britannia! by Adrian Piotrovsky (1931)
 Op. 31: Music to the stage revue Hypothetically Murdered by Voyevodin and Riss (1931)
 Op. 32: Music to the play Hamlet by Shakespeare (1931–1932)  
 Op. 37: Music to the play The Human Comedy after Balzac for small orchestra (1933–1934)
 Op. 44: Music to the play Hail, Spain by Afinogenov (1936)
 Op. 58a: Music to the play King Lear by Shakespeare (1940) 
 Op. 63: Music to the spectacle Native Country, suite Native Leningrad (1942)
 Op. 66: Music to the spectacle Russian River for soloists, choir and orchestra (1944)
 Op. 72: Two Songs to the spectacle Victorious Spring after Svetlov for voices and orchestra (1945)

Choral
 The Oath to the People's Commissar for bass, chorus and piano (1941)
 Songs of a Guard's Division ("The Fearless Regiments Are On the Move"), marching song for bass and mixed chorus with simple accompaniment for bayan or piano (1941)
 Russian Folk Songs for chorus (1943)
 Three Russian Folk Songs for two soloists and chorus with piano accompaniment (1943)
 Op. 74: Poem of the Motherland, cantata for mezzo-soprano, tenor, two baritones, chorus and orchestra (1947)
 Rayok (Little Paradise) for four voices, chorus and piano (1948)
 Op. 81: Song of the Forests, oratorio after Dolmatovsky for tenor, bass soli, mixed & boys' chorus and orchestra (1949)
 Op. 86a: The Homeland Hears for chorus and tenor soloist with wordless chorus (1951)
 Op. 88: Ten Poems on Texts by Revolutionary Poets for chorus and boys' chorus a cappella (1951)
 Op. 90: The Sun Shines over Our Motherland, cantata after Dolmatovsky for mixed & boys' chorus and orchestra (1952)
 Op. 104: Cultivation: Two Russian Folk Song Arrangements for chorus a cappella (1957)
 Op. 119: The Execution of Stepan Razin, cantata after Yevtushenko for bass, mixed chorus and orchestra (1964)
 Op. 124: Two Choruses after Davidenko for chorus and orchestra (1962)
 Op. 136: Loyalty, eight ballads after Dolmatovsky for unaccompanied male chorus (1970)

Vocal
 Op. 4: Two Fables of Krylov for mezzo-soprano, female chorus and chamber orchestra (1922)
 Op. 21: Six Romances on Texts by Japanese Poets for tenor and orchestra (1928–1932)
 From Karl Marx to Our Own Days, symphonic poem for solo voices, chorus and orchestra (1932)
 Impromptu: Madrigal, for voice and piano (1933)
 Op. 46: Four Romances on Verses by Pushkin for bass and piano (1936–1937)
 Seven Arrangements of Finnish Folk Songs for soloists (soprano and tenor) and chamber ensemble (1939)
 Op. 62: Six Romances on Verses by English Poets for bass and piano (1942)
 Patriotic Song after Dolmatovsky for voices (1943)
 "Song About the Red Army" after Golodny (1943)
 Op. 79: From Jewish Folk Poetry, song cycle for soprano, contralto, tenor and piano (1948)
 Op. 79a: From Jewish Folk Poetry, song cycle for soprano, contralto, tenor and orchestra (1948)
 Op. 80b: Three Songs from Meeting on the Elbe for voice and piano (1956)
 Op. 84: Two Romances on Verses by Lermontov for male voice and piano (1950)
 Op. 86: Four Songs to Words by Dolmatovsky for voice and piano (1951)
 Op. 91: Four Monologues on Verses by Pushkin for bass and piano (1952)
 Greek Songs for voice and piano (1952–1953)
 Pendozalis, Greek Song for voice and piano (1954)
 October Dawn, song for soloists and chorus (1954)
 Op. 98: Five Romances on Verses by Dolmatovsky for bass and piano (1954)
 Op. 98a: "There Were Kisses", song after Dolmatovsky for voice and piano (1954)
 Op. 100: Spanish Songs for (mezzo)soprano and piano (1956)
 Op. 109: Satires (Pictures of the Past), Five Romances on Verses by Sasha Chorny for soprano and piano (1960) (arranged for voice and orchestra by B. Tishchenko, 1980)
 Op. 121: Five Romances on Texts from the Magazine Krokodil for bass and piano (1965)
 Op. 123: "Preface to the Complete Collection of My Works and Brief Reflections on this Preface" for bass and piano (1966)
 Op. 127: Seven Romances on Poems by Alexander Blok for soprano, violin, cello and piano (1967)
 Op. 128: Romance "Spring, Spring" to Verses by Pushkin for bass and piano (1967)
 Op. 140: Six Romances on Verses by English Poets for bass and chamber orchestra (1971)
 Op. 143: Six Poems by Marina Tsvetayeva, suite for contralto and piano (1973)
 Op. 143a: Six Poems by Marina Tsvetayeva, suite for contralto and orchestra (1973)
 Op. 145: Suite on Verses of Michelangelo Buonarroti for bass and piano (1974)
 Op. 145a: Suite on Verses by Michelangelo Buonarroti for bass and orchestra (1975)
 Op. 146: Four Verses of Captain Lebyadkin to texts by Dostoevsky for bass and piano (1975)

Orchestrations of music by other composers
 Orchestration of I Waited in the Grotto by Rimsky-Korsakov for soprano and orchestra (1921)
 Op. 16: Tahiti-Trot for orchestra (1928)
 Op. 17: Pastorale and Capriccio: Two Pieces by Domenico Scarlatti for wind orchestra (1928)
 Orchestration of The Internationale by Pierre De Geyter (1937)
 Op. 58: Orchestration of the opera Boris Godunov by Modest Mussorgsky (1939–1940)
 Orchestration of Wiener Blut by Johann Strauss II (1940)
 Orchestration of Vergnügungszug by Johann Strauss II (1940)
 Orchestration of 27 Romances and Songs Arrangements (1941)
 Orchestration of Eight British and American Folk Songs for voice(s) and orchestra (1943)
 Orchestration and completion of Rothschild's Violin by Venyamin Fleishman (1944)
 Op. 106: Re-orchestration of Khovanshchina by Modest Mussorgsky (1959)
 Orchestration of Songs and Dances of Death by Modest Mussorgsky for voice and orchestra (1962)
 Op. 125: Re-orchestration of the Cello Concerto in A minor by Robert Schumann (1963)
 Re-orchestration of the Cello Concerto No. 1 by Boris Tishchenko (1969)
 Orchestration of Mephistopheles' Song of the Flea by Ludwig van Beethoven (1975)

Transcriptions of music by other composers
 Reduction for mixed choir and piano four-hands of the Symphony of Psalms by Igor Stravinsky (circa early 1930s)
 Reduction for two pianos of the Symphonie Liturgique by Arthur Honegger (1947)
 Reduction for piano four-hands of the second movement from the Symphony No. 10 by Gustav Mahler (fragment; circa mid 1940s)

In chronological order

See also
 List of symphonies by number
 List of symphonies by name

References

Footnotes

Bibliography

 
Shostakovich, Dmitri, compositions by